St. John, Missouri is a city in St. Louis County, Missouri.

St. John, Missouri may also refer to:

St. John, Pulaski County, Missouri, an unincorporated community
St. John, Putnam County, Missouri, an unincorporated community